Lake George Scott, also called Scott Pond, is a small lake situated on the Tekapo River approximately 3 kilometres downstream of Lake Tekapo, New Zealand. It is a man-made lake formed to divert water from the river into the Tekapo hydro electric canal.  The Lake is named after the late George Scott a former superintendent of the nearby Tekapo A power station. 
New Zealand's Department of Conservation maintains a walkway to the lake from the Lake Tekapo Township.

References

George Scott